The 2015–16 Equatoguinean Primera División season is the top level of competition in Equatorial Guinea. It began on 22 January 2017 and concluded on 19 July 2017.

First stage

Región Continental

Región Insular

Liguilla Nacional
Point totals from first stage carried over; teams only play opponents from other zone.

The title was won by Leones Vegetarianos
 6   4  1  1   9- 4  44 (31 pts in first stage + 13 pts in second stage).

References

Football leagues in Equatorial Guinea
Premier League
Equatorial Guinea